Highway 982 is a provincial highway in the east central region of the Canadian province of Saskatchewan. It runs from Highway 8 to Highway 9. Highway 982 is about 57 km (35 mi) long. Highway 982 is also known as Little Swan Road.

Highway 982 travels along the western edge of Porcupine Hills, from near Swan Plain to Highway 9 near where Pepaw River and Etomami River meet. Much of the northern route of the highway follows the Pepaw River. The highway gives access to Porcupine Hills Provincial Park and passes by several lakes, including Saginas Lake, Pepaw Lake, Parr Hill Lake, and Kenney Lake. Highway 982 also connects with Highway 983.

See also
Roads in Saskatchewan
Transportation in Saskatchewan

References

982